The Government of Fresno County is defined and authorized under the California Constitution, law, and the Charter of the County of Fresno. Much of the Government of California is in practice the responsibility of county governments, such as the Government of Fresno County. The County government provides countywide services such as elections and voter registration, law enforcement, jails, vital records, property records, tax collection, public health, and social services. In addition the County serves as the local government for all unincorporated areas.

The County government is composed of the elected five-member Board of Supervisors, several other elected offices including the Sheriff, District Attorney, Assessor-Recorder, Auditor-Controller/Treasurer-Tax Collector, Coroner-Public Administrator, and Clerk/Registrar of Voters, and numerous county departments and entities under the supervision of the County Administrator.

Some chartered cities such as Fresno provide municipal services such as police, public safety, libraries, parks and recreation, and zoning. Some other cities arrange to have the County provide some or all of these services on a contract basis. In addition, several entities of the government of California have jurisdiction conterminous with Fresno County, such as the Fresno County Superior Court.

Organization

Board of Supervisors 
The five-member elected Fresno County Board of Supervisors (BOS) is the county legislature. The board operates in a legislative, executive, and quasi-judicial capacity. As a legislative authority, it can pass ordinances for the unincorporated areas (ordinances that affect the whole county, like posting of restaurant ratings, must be ratified by the individual city). As an executive body, it can tell the county departments what to do, and how to do it. As a quasi-judicial body, the Board is the final venue of appeal in the local planning process.

As of January 2019 the members of the Fresno County Board of Supervisors are:

 Brian Pacheco—District 1
 Steve Brandau—District 2 
 Sal Quintero—District 3 
 Buddy Mendes—District 4
 Nathan Magsig—District 5

Elected officers 
In addition to the Board of Supervisors, there are several elected officers that form the Government of Fresno County that are required by the California Constitution and California law.

The Fresno County Sheriff provides general-service law enforcement to unincorporated areas of the county, serving as the equivalent of the county police for unincorporated areas of the county, as well as incorporated cities within the county who have contracted with the agency for law-enforcement services (known as "contract cities"). The Sheriff's Office also manages the Fresno County Jail, which is located in downtown Fresno. The standard sidearm is the Smith & Wesson M&P.

The Fresno County District Attorney prosecutes felony and misdemeanor crimes that occur within the jurisdiction of Fresno County.

Other departments 
The Department of Social Services (DSS) administers multiple California welfare programs within the county, such as Medi-Cal (Medicaid), CalFresh (food stamps), CalWORKs (Temporary Assistance for Needy Families), and general assistance.

The Department of Public Health (DPH) administers a Medically Indigent Service Program (MISP) and a Low Income Health Program (ObamaCare).

Law 
The Fresno County Ordinance Code is the codified law of the County in the form of ordinances passed by the Board of Supervisors. Every act prohibited or declared unlawful, and every failure to perform an act required, by the ordinances are misdemeanor crimes, unless otherwise specified as infractions.

Other governments

California 

The Fresno County Superior Court, which covers the entire county, is not a County department but a division of the State's trial court system. Historically, the courthouses were county-owned buildings that were maintained at county expense, which created significant friction since the trial court judges, as officials of the state government, had to lobby the county Board of Supervisors for facility renovations and upgrades. In turn, the state judiciary successfully persuaded the state Legislature to authorize the transfer of all courthouses to the state government in 2008 and 2009 (so that judges would have direct control over their own courthouses). Courthouse security is still provided by the county government under a contract with the state.

Fresno 
The Government of Fresno has a strong-mayor form of mayor–council government with a Mayor and seven City Council members. The City Manager is accountable to the mayor for overseeing the performance of 14 departments, including police, fire, transportation, water, solid waste, airports, parks and recreation, public works, finance, facilities and various administrative functions. The current Mayor as of January 2021 is Jerry Dyer and the Councilmembers are:

 Esmeralda Soria—District 1
 Mike Karbassi—District 2
 Miguel Arias—District 3
 Tyler Maxwell—District 4
 Luis Chavez—District 5
 Garry Bredefeld—District 6
 Nelson Esparza—District 7

School districts 

Fresno County is covered by the State Center Community College District, the West Hills Community College District, and portions of the Merced Community College District.

Special districts 
The Fresno Local Agency Formation Commission is the Local Agency Formation Commission (LAFCo) for Fresno County and regulates most special district and city boundaries.

Notes

External links 
 Fresno County government website
 Fresno County Ordinance Code from Municode

 
Fresno